Latin pop (in Spanish and in Portuguese: Pop latino) is a pop music subgenre that is a fusion of US–style music production with Latin music genres from anywhere in Latin America and Spain. Originating with Spanish-speaking musicians, Latin pop may also be made by musicians in Portuguese (mainly in Brazilian Portuguese) and the various Romance Creole languages. Latin pop usually combines upbeat Latin music with American pop music. Latin pop is commonly associated with Spanish-language pop, rock, and dance music.

History
Latin pop is one of the most popular Latin music genres today. However, before the arrival of artists like  Alejandro Sanz, Thalía, Luis Miguel, Selena, Paulina Rubio,  Shakira, Carlos Vives, Ricky Martin, Gloria Trevi and Enrique Iglesias, Latin pop first reached a global audience through the work of bandleader Sergio Mendes in the mid-1960s, although artists like Carmen Miranda popularized Latin Samba music in Hollywood decades before this. In later decades, it was defined by the romantic ballads that legendary artists such as Julio Iglesias or Roberto Carlos produced in the 1970s. 

Ricky Martin is considered to be the King of Latin Pop.

Influences and development

Latin pop became the most popular form of Latin music in the United States during the 1980s and 1990s, with acts such as Puerto Rican boyband Menudo, even achieving massive crossover success among non-Latino listeners during the late 1990s. While not restricted to America by any means, Latin pop was profoundly affected by production techniques and other styles of music — both Latin and otherwise — that originated primarily in the United States. Tejano music, centered in Texas and the United States/Mexico border region, had begun to introduce synthesizers, slicker production, and a more urban sensibility to formerly root styles like norteño and conjunto.

Moreover, New York and Miami were home to thriving Latin club scenes, which during the 1980s led to the rise of Latin freestyle, a club-oriented dance music that was rooted in Latin rhythms but relied on synthesizers and drum machines for most of its arrangements. Both of these sounds influenced the rise of Latin pop, which retained Latin rhythms in its uptempo numbers but relied more on mainstream pop for its melodic sense.

Latin pop's first major crossover star was Gloria Estefan, who scored a succession of non-club-oriented dance-pop hits during the mid- to late 1980s, but eventually became known more as an adult contemporary diva with an affinity for sweeping ballads. This blend of Latinized dance-pop and adult contemporary balladeering dominated Latin pop through the 1990s. Most of its artists sang in Spanish for Latino audiences, although Latin pop's similarity to the mainstream helped several performers score crossover hits when they chose to record in English. Jon Secada landed several pop hits during the mid-1990s, and Tejano pop star Selena's album Dreaming of You actually debuted posthumously at number one on the album charts upon its 1995 release.

The late '90s and early 2000s saw Latin artists such as Ricky Martin, Enrique Iglesias, Shakira, Jennifer Lopez and  ex-husband Marc Anthony, Paulina Rubio, Jade Esteban Estrada, Thalía, among others, achieve crossover mainstream success. Other traditionally pop artists also made forays into Latin pop either finding success experimenting with the sound, such as Debelah Morgan and 98 Degrees, or recording Spanish versions of their songs or albums, such as Christina Aguilera and Jessica Simpson, to name a few.

See also

Grammy Award for Best Latin Pop Album
Latin Grammy Award for Best Contemporary Pop Vocal Album
Lo Nuestro Award for Pop Song of the Year
Billboard Latin Music Awards
Latin Pop Airplay
Music of Brazil
Mexican pop music
Pop music
Latin ballad
Latin music
Music of Latin America
Music of Spain
Latin American music in the United States
Regional Mexican
Tropical music
Nueva ola
Music of Colombia

References

External links
 Univision musica (Univision musica)
 RITMOSON MUSIC NEWS

 
Pop
Pop music genres
Spanish music
Spanish-language music
1970s in Latin music
1980s in Latin music
1990s in Latin music
2000s in Latin music
2010s in Latin music
Latin music genres